Karadygan (Qaradigän) is a rural locality (a village) in Bikbausky Selsoviet, Zianchurinsky District, Bashkortostan, Russia. The population was 20 as of 2010. There are 2 streets.

Geography 
Karadygan is located 14 km east of Isyangulovo (the district's administrative centre) by road. Bikbau is the nearest rural locality.

References 

Rural localities in Zianchurinsky District